Leandro de Medeiros Silva (born January 21, 1987, in Brasília), known as Leandro Brasília, is a Brazilian footballer who plays for Real Brasília as midfielder.

Career statistics

References

External links

1987 births
Living people
Brazilian footballers
Association football midfielders
Campeonato Brasileiro Série A players
Campeonato Brasileiro Série B players
Campeonato Brasileiro Série C players
Campeonato Brasileiro Série D players
Cruzeiro Esporte Clube players
Esporte Clube Itaúna players
América Futebol Clube (MG) players
Ipatinga Futebol Clube players
Criciúma Esporte Clube players
Ceará Sporting Club players
Mirassol Futebol Clube players
Clube de Regatas Brasil players
Clube Atlético Bragantino players
Rio Preto Esporte Clube players
Tupi Football Club players
Clube Atlético Linense players
Clube do Remo players
Villa Nova Atlético Clube players
Footballers from Brasília